Virginia's 2nd Senate district is one of 40 districts in the Senate of Virginia. It has been represented by Democrat Mamie Locke since 2004.

Geography
District 2 is located in the Hampton Roads metropolitan area in southeastern Virginia, including parts of York County, Hampton, Newport News, and Portsmouth.

The district overlaps with Virginia's 2nd and 3rd congressional districts, and with the 79th, 80th, 91st, 92nd, 93rd, 95th, and 96th districts of the Virginia House of Delegates.

Recent election results

2019

2015

2011

Federal and statewide results in District 2

Historical results
All election results below took place prior to 2011 redistricting, and thus were under different district lines.

2007

2003

1999

1995

District officeholders since 1940

References

Virginia Senate districts
Hampton, Virginia
Newport News, Virginia
Portsmouth, Virginia
York County, Virginia